Pimpri Assembly constituency is one of the twenty one constituencies of Maharashtra Vidhan Sabha located in the city of Pune, India.

It is a part of the Maval (Lok Sabha constituency) along with five other assembly constituencies: Chinchwad and Maval from Pune District and Karjat, Uran and Panvel from the Raigad district.

Members of Legislative Assembly

Election Result

Assembly elections 2019

References

Assembly constituencies of Pune district
Assembly constituencies of Maharashtra
Pimpri-Chinchwad